Harald J.W. Mueller-Kirsten (born 1935) is a German Theoretical Physicist specializing in Quantum field theory, Quantum mechanics and Mathematical physics. He is known for his work on Asymptotic expansions of Mathieu functions, spheroidal wave functions, Lamé functions and ellipsoidal wave functions and their eigenvalues,
Asymptotic expansions of Regge poles for Yukawa potentials,
Eigenvalue and level-splitting formula for double-well potentials,
Path integral method applied to anharmonic and periodic potentials, discovery that for anharmonic and periodic potentials the equation of small fluctuations around the classical solution is a Lamé equation, derivation of S-matrix and absorptivity for the singular potential  (cf. modified Mathieu equation) and application to string theory, construction and quantization of gauge theory models, canonical quantization using Dirac bracket formalism in Hamiltonian formulation, BRST quantization and Faddeev-Jackiw quantization of field theory models with constraints and Supersymmetry.

Education and career
Müller-Kirsten obtained the B.Sc. (First Class Honours) in 1957 and the Ph.D. in 1960 from the University of Western Australia in Perth, where his doctoral advisor was Robert Balson Dingle.
Thereafter he was postdoc at the Ludwig Maximilians University in Munich (Institute of F. Bopp) and obtained the habilitation there in 1971.  Müller-Kirsten was an assistant professor at the American University of Beirut in 1967, NATO-Fellow at the Lawrence Radiation Laboratory in Berkeley in 1970, and Max-Kade-Foundation Fellow at SLAC, Stanford in 1974–75.  In 1972 he was appointed Wissenschaftlicher Rat and professor (H2) at the University of Kaiserslautern, then there university professor (C2) and in 1995 university professor (C3).

Research achievements
 Asymptotic expansions of Mathieu functions, spheroidal wave functions, Lamé functions and ellipsoidal wave functions and their eigenvalues.
 Asymptotic expansions of Regge poles for Yukawa potentials (in agreement with Langer-corrected WKB calculations).
 Eigenvalue and level-splitting formula for double-well potentials.
 Path integral method applied to quartic and cosine potentials.
 Discovery that for quartic and cosine potentials the equation of small fluctuations around the classical solution is a Lamé equation.
 Derivation of S-matrix and absorptivity for the singular potential  (cf. modified Mathieu equation) and application to string theory.
 Construction and quantization of gauge theory models, Faddeev–Jackiw quantization of systems with constraints,

Books
 with Armin Wiedemann: Supersymmetry, An Introduction with Conceptual and Calculational Details, World Scientific, Singapore, 1987, 2nd ed.as Introduction to Supersymmetry (=World Scientific Lecture Notes in Physics, Nr. 80), loc. cit. 2010, .
 Electrodynamics, An Introduction including Quantum Effects, World Scientific, Hackensack NJ, 2004, 2nd ed. Electrodynamicsloc. cit. 2011, .
 Introduction to Quantum Mechanics: Schrödinger Equation and Path Integral, World Scientific, Singapore, 2006, 2nd ed., World Scientific, Hackensack, NJ, 2012, .
  Classical Mechanics and Relativity, World Scientific, Hackensack NJ, 2008, .
 Basics of Statistical Physics, A Bachelor Degree Introduction, World Scientific, Hackensack NJ, 2010, 2nd ed. as Basics of Statistical Physics, loc.cit. 2013,  3rd ed., 2022, .

Outside of physics
In his book Rätsel Wahrheit (Puzzle Truth) Müller-Kirsten deals with university and society related topics such as the university as a competitive society and problems of freedom of speech and opinion, Verlag Haag+Herchen GmbH, 2017, .
 Henry Kendall: Ausgewählte Gedichte, Translation into German of Selected Poems by Henry Kendall (after Selected Poems by Henry Kendall, chosen by his son Frederick C. Kendall, Angus and Robertson Ltd., 1927), Verlag Haag+Herchen GmbH, 2021, .

References

External links

Harald J. W. Mueller-Kirsten's Home Page at the University of Kaiserslautern, Germany
Harald J. W. Mueller-Kirsten's Scientific Publications Profile at Inspirehep.net
Harald J. W. Mueller-Kirsten's Scientific Publications Profile at Research Gate

Living people
1935 births
Theoretical physicists
Academic staff of the Technical University of Kaiserslautern
University of Western Australia alumni
20th-century German physicists

new: